My Girl is a 1991 American coming-of-age comedy-drama film directed by Howard Zieff, written by Laurice Elehwany, and starring Dan Aykroyd, Jamie Lee Curtis, Macaulay Culkin, and Anna Chlumsky in her first role in a major motion picture. The film tells the story of an 11-year-old girl living in Madison, Pennsylvania, during the summer of 1972. The film's title refers to the classic 1964 song of the same name by The Temptations, which is also featured in the film's end credits. A book based on the film was written by Patricia Hermes. The film grossed $121 million on a budget of $17 million. A sequel, My Girl 2, was released in 1994.

Plot

Vada Sultenfuss is an 11-year-old girl living in Madison, Pennsylvania in the summer of 1972. Her father, Harry Sultenfuss, operates the town's funeral parlor, which also serves as their home. Vada's upbringing leads her to suffer from hypochondria and develop an obsession with death, and her father fails to understand it. Also living with them is "Gramoo", Vada's paternal grandmother, whose recent mind wandering accentuates Vada's worries. Her uncle Phil lives nearby and frequently helps the family.

Vada hangs out with Thomas J. Sennett, an unpopular boy her age who is allergic to "everything". Other girls tease the two, thinking they are more than just friends. Thomas J. often accompanies Vada when she visits the doctor, who assures her that she is not sick. He is quite nice to her, although she is often unkind in return.

Vada's summer begins well. She befriends Shelly DeVoto, the new makeup artist at the funeral parlor, who provides her with some much needed guidance. She also develops a crush on Mr. Bixler, her fifth-grade school teacher, and hears about an adult poetry writing class he is teaching. Wondering how to pay for the class, Vada schemes after seeing enough money in a cookie jar in Shelly's camper. During her first class, when advised to write about what is in her soul, Vada fears that she killed her mother, who died two days after giving birth to her.

When Harry and Shelly start dating, Vada's attitude towards Shelly changes. One night, Vada follows Harry and Shelly to a bingo game and brings Thomas J. along to disrupt it. On the Fourth of July, when Shelly's ex-husband Danny shows up, Vada hopes that he will take Shelly back, but to no avail.

Following the holiday, and another doctor visit, Vada and Thomas J. spot a beehive in the woods, which Thomas J. knocks down. Vada loses her mood ring in the process, and while the two look for it, the bees swarm and force them to run away. Shortly afterward, Harry invites Vada to a carnival, but she is unenthusiastic to go when he announces Shelly is also coming. Vada becomes distressed when the two announce their engagement there, leading her to contemplate running away.

Later, Vada screams when she discovers she is hemorrhaging. With Harry not around, Shelly explains to Vada that she is experiencing her first period. As Vada accepts this happens only to girls, she is unwilling to see Thomas J., who happens to come by shortly afterward. A couple of days later, Vada and Thomas J. sit under a willow tree, wondering what a first kiss feels like, and they share one. After Vada heads home, Thomas J. returns to the woods to search for Vada's mood ring. Unaware that the beehive he knocked down is still active, he is killed by the bees due to his allergy.

Harry is left to deliver the tragic news to Vada. Following another doctor visit, a devastated Vada stays in her bedroom for a full day. Prior to Thomas J.'s funeral, Shelly suggests that Harry console Vada, but he brushes her off. To this, Shelly emotionally urges him to realize the significance of his daughter's pain. When Vada finally leaves her bedroom and sees Thomas J.'s body in his casket, her grief becomes so strong that she runs away. In tears, she rushes to Mr. Bixler's house, wanting to stay with him but discovering he is engaged.

Vada continues her grieving by the willow tree where she and Thomas J. hung out. When Vada returns home, everyone is relieved, including Shelly, whom Vada begins to accept as her future stepmother. Her grief also manages to mend the rift between her and her father, who assures Vada that her mother's death was not her fault.

Toward the end of summer, Vada and her father see and comfort Mrs. Sennett, who still struggles with her son's death. She returns Vada's mood ring, which Thomas J. had found. On the last day of her writing class, Vada reads a poem in memory of her best friend.

Cast
 Dan Aykroyd as Harry Sultenfuss
 Jamie Lee Curtis as Shelly DeVoto
 Macaulay Culkin as Thomas J. Sennett
 Anna Chlumsky as Vada Sultenfuss
 Richard Masur as Phil Sultenfuss
 Griffin Dunne as Mr. Bixler
 Ann Nelson as Gramoo Sultenfuss
 Anthony R. Jones as Arthur

Production
The screenplay, written by Laurice Elehwany, was originally titled Born Jaundiced, and was purchased by Imagine Entertainment in July 1990. On August 24, 1990, it was reported in Daily Variety that the screenplay had been re-titled to I Am Woman, but was subsequently changed to its final title, My Girl, in the spring of 1991. Elehwany based the fictional setting of Madison on the small towns in southwestern Pennsylvania where she grew up.

Culkin and Chlumsky were cast in the lead roles of Thomas J. and Vada, respectively, in January 1991. Filming took place in Bartow and Sanford, Florida beginning in February 1991. Exteriors of the Sultenfuss home were supplied by a real Victorian home in Bartow, while the house's interiors were built on a soundstage in Orlando.

When My Girl was submitted to the Motion Picture Association of America (MPAA) in September 1991, it was rated PG-13. Later that month, the film's producers won an appeal to have the film reclassified to a PG rating.

Release
My Girl was released on November 27, 1991.

Critical response
The film holds a 50% score on Rotten Tomatoes based on sixteen reviews. Roger Ebert gave the film 3.5 stars out of 4, writing: "The beauty in this film is in its directness. There are some obligatory scenes. But there are also some very original and touching ones. This is a movie that has its heart in the right place." Owen Gleiberman of Entertainment Weekly praised Chlumsky's performance in the film, but conceded that "there’s something discomforting about a movie that takes the experience of an audacious, conflicted child and reduces it to: She needs to Confront Her Feelings. My Girl has some sweet, funny moments (the cast is uniformly appealing), yet it unfolds in a landscape of paralyzing, pop-psych banality."

Film critic Caryn James cited the film as being part of a  "trend toward stronger, more realistic themes in children's films", specifically its representations of death, specifically that of a young child. David Kehr of the Chicago Tribune wrote of the film: "If My Girl helps stimulate family discussions of death and loss, it will certainly have done some good in the world. But at the same time, its aesthetic interest is virtually nil... Though My Girl seeks to stir large, devastating emotions, Zieff seems afraid to touch on anything too difficult or unpleasant, lest it alienate his audience. The results are curiously gutless and unmoving, as Zieff finds himself stuck with a sentimentality without substance, a poetry without pain." Peter Rainer of the Los Angeles Times was similarly critical of the film's "syrupy" elements, concluding: "The mixture of winsomeness and deadpan frights in My Girl ought to be weirder and more interesting than it is. After all, a girl who survives a household where bodies are embalmed in the basement is the kind of plucky heroine that movies about kids need right now. Or movies about adults, for that matter."

Janet Maslin of The New York Times was critical of the screenplay for being made up of "loose ends bound together only by intimations of mortality and family crisis," summarizing: "It's not hard for the maudlin My Girl to make its audience weepy at the sight of America's favorite kid in an open coffin. But it is difficult for this film to mix the sugary unreality of a television show with such a clumsy and manipulative morbid streak." Variety noted: "Plenty of shrewd commercial calculation went into concocting the right sugar coating for this story of an 11-year-old girl's painful maturation, but [the] chemistry seems right."

Box office
My Girl opened at No. 2 with $12,391,783, grossing $59,489,799 domestically, and $62 million internationally for a worldwide total of $121,489,799.

Music
The soundtrack of the film contains several 1960s and 1970s pop hits, in addition to the title song (by The Temptations), including "Wedding Bell Blues" (The 5th Dimension), "If You Don't Know Me by Now" (Harold Melvin & the Blue Notes), "Bad Moon Rising" (Creedence Clearwater Revival), "Good Lovin'" (The Rascals), and "Saturday in the Park" (Chicago). When Vada gets upset, she plugs her ears and sings "Do Wah Diddy Diddy", the Manfred Mann version of which is also included on the soundtrack album. In addition, Vada and Thomas J. play "The Name Game" and sing "Witch Doctor", while Vada has posters of the Broadway musical Hair, the Carpenters, and Donny Osmond on her bedroom wall.

Certifications

References

External links

 
 
 
 
 

1991 films
American coming-of-age films
American comedy-drama films
American romantic drama films
Children's comedy-drama films
Columbia Pictures films
Films about death
Films scored by James Newton Howard
Films directed by Howard Zieff
Films produced by Brian Grazer
Films set in 1972
Films set in Pennsylvania
Films shot in Florida
Funeral homes in fiction
Imagine Entertainment films
Tragicomedy films
Films about puberty
1990s English-language films
1990s American films